Crocin is a carotenoid chemical compound that is found in the flowers of crocus and gardenia. Crocin is the chemical primarily responsible for the color of saffron.

Chemically, crocin is the diester formed from the disaccharide gentiobiose and the dicarboxylic acid crocetin. When isolated as a pure chemical compound, it has a deep red color and forms crystals with a melting point of 186 °C. When dissolved in water, it forms an orange solution.

The term crocins may also refer to members of a series of related hydrophilic carotenoids that are either monoglycosyl or diglycosyl polyene esters of crocetin. The crocin underlying saffron's aroma is α-crocin (a carotenoid pigment that may compose more than 10% of dry saffron's mass): trans-crocetin di-(β-D-gentiobiosyl) ester; it bears the systematic (IUPAC) name 8,8-diapo-8,8-carotenoic acid.

The major active component of saffron is the yellow pigment crocin 2 (three other derivatives with different glycosylations are known) containing a gentiobiose (disaccharide) group at each end of the molecule. The five major biologically active components of saffron, namely the four crocins and crocetin, can be measured with HPLC-UV.

Research

Absorption 

Crocin ingested orally is hydrolised to crocetin in the gut which is absorbed across the intestinal barrier, and that crocetin can permeate the Blood–brain barrier.

Antioxidant 

Crocin has been shown to be an antioxidant, and neural protective agent. Crocin can reduce oxidative stress and ROS (Reactive Oxygen Species) through enhancement of gene expression of Nrf2, HO-1, and

anti-oxidant enzymes, such as CAT, GSH, and SOD.

Neuroprotective 

Crocin and its derivative crocetin may counteract oxidative stress, mitochondrial dysfunction and neuroinflammation, which are closely linked to initiation and progression of major brain pathologies such as Alzheimer's and Parkinson's Disease.

In an animal model of malathion-induced Parkinson's Disease, crocin reduced the neurotoxic effect of malathion by its anti-apoptotic activity and  it regulated the expression of proteins involved in Parkinson's disease pathogenesis.

Crocins can suppress the active forms of GSK3β and ERK1/2 kinases,  significantly reducing  tau phosphorylation, thus suppressing key molecular pathways of Alzheimer's Disease pathogenesis.

Mood 

Crocin displays possible antidepressant properties in mice and humans.

Cancer 

Crocin through the PI3K/AKT/mTOR, MAPK, VEGF, Wnt/β-catenin, and JAK-STAT suppression has antiproliferative properties. Also, the Nrf2 and p53 signaling pathway activation may be effective in the antiproliferative effect of crocin.

Behavior 

Aphrodisiac properties of crocin in male rats has been observed at very high doses.

References

Bibliography

External links 

Carotenoid glycosides
Dietary antioxidants
Food colorings
Saffron